The Embassy of the Republic of Indonesia in Manila is the diplomatic mission of the Republic of Indonesia to the Philippines. The embassy is located at 185 Salcedo Street in Makati City, Metro Manila and is currently headed by Ambassador Agus Widjojo which was appointed by President Joko Widodo on 12 January 2022.

History 

Indonesia established diplomatic relations with the Philippines in 1949 and opened its consular office in Manila. Indonesia then opened its embassy headed by an ambassador in the 1950s. Its first ambassador was Alexander Andries Maramis which took office from 1950 to 1953.

References

See also 

 Indonesia–Philippines relations
 List of diplomatic missions in Indonesia

Indonesia
Philippines
Indonesia–Philippines relations